Sir Sangarapillai Pararajasingam was a Ceylonese landed proprietor and member of the Senate of Ceylon.

Early life and family

Pararajasingam was born on 25 June 1896. He was the son of A. V. Sangarapillai, founder of Manipay Hindu College. Pararajasingam was educated at S. Thomas' College, Mount Lavinia and Wesley College, Colombo.

Pararajasingam married Pathmavathy, daughter of Sir Ponnambalam Arunachalam.

Career
Pararajasingam worked as a broker for Messrs Volkart Brothers. He was chairman of the Low Country Producers Association and on the Board of Directors of the Agricultural and Industrial Credit Corporations, Ceylon Coconut Board and Ceylon Institute of Scientific and Industrial Research.

Pararajasingam was president of the Ceylon Poultry Club and Colombo Rotary Club.

Later life
Pararajasingam was appointed to the Senate of Ceylon in 1954. In the 1955 Birthday Honours, he was knighted for services to agriculture.

References

1896 births
Alumni of S. Thomas' College, Mount Lavinia
Alumni of Wesley College, Colombo
Ceylonese Knights Bachelor
Members of the Senate of Ceylon
People from British Ceylon
Sri Lankan Tamil politicians
Year of death missing